Timothy John Whitehead (born ) is a South African professional rugby union player who most recently played with . His regular position is centre.

Career

Youth and Varsity Cup rugby

Whitehead played for Varsity Cup side  in the 2008, 2010, 2011 editions of the competition. He made eleven appearances in this competition during the three seasons, helping Ikeys win the title in 2011 by beating  in Pretoria.

He also played for the  side in the Under-21 Currie Cup competitions in 2008 and 2009.

Western Province / Stormers

After one more start in the Vodacom Cup that season, Whitehead was drafted into the  squad for the 2010 Super 14 season. He made a further two starts and seven substitute appearances during the remainder of the season.

He also made his debut in the Currie Cup in the same season.

He fell out of Super Rugby contention in 2011, but made another six appearances in the 2011 Vodacom Cup competition and seven in the 2011 Currie Cup Premier Division.

Sharks / Sharks

With new head coach Jake White taking over at the Sharks, Whitehead was a surprise omission from the squad for the 2014 Super Rugby season, being relegated to the Vodacom Cup squad instead.

Eastern Province Kings

He joined Port Elizabeth-based side  prior to the 2014 Currie Cup Premier Division season. He left after two seasons at the Kings, after the non-payment of player salaries allowed him to disengage himself from his contract.

External links

References

1988 births
Living people
Rugby union players from Port Elizabeth
White South African people
South African people of British descent
South African rugby union players
Sharks (rugby union) players
Sharks (Currie Cup) players
Stormers players
Western Province (rugby union) players
Eastern Province Elephants players
Rugby union centres
Alumni of Grey High School
University of Cape Town alumni